The 2008 FIBA Africa Under-18 Championship for Men (alternatively the Afrobasket U18) was the 10th FIBA Africa Under-18 Championship for Women, organized by FIBA Africa and played under the auspices of the Fédération Internationale de Basketball, the basketball sport governing body and the African zone thereof and qualified for the 2009 World Cup. The tournament was held from October 3–12 in Rades and Ezzahra, Tunisia and won by Mali.

The tournament qualified both the winner and the runner-up for the 2009 Under-19 Women's World Cup.

Format
The 11 teams were divided into two groups (Groups A+B) for the preliminary round.
Round robin for the preliminary round; the top four teams advanced to the quarterfinals.
From there on a knockout system was used until the final.

Squads

Draw

Preliminary round

Group A

Group B

Knockout stage 
Championship bracket

5-8th bracket

9–12th classification

Quarterfinals

9th place

Classification 5–8

Semifinals

7th place

5th place

Bronze medal game

Gold medal game

Final standings

Mali rosterAdama Sissoko, Aissata Djibo, Aissata Traoré, Aminata Mariko, Astan Dabo, Djenebou Sacko, Fatoumata Traoré, Kankou Coulibaly, Laoudy Maiga, Nassira Traore, Ouleymatou Coulibaly, Sega Bah Coach:

All Tournament Team

Statistical Leaders

Individual Tournament Highs

Points

Rebounds

Assists

Steals

Blocks

Turnovers

2-point field goal percentage

3-point field goal percentage

Free throw percentage

Individual Game Highs

Team Tournament Highs

Points

Rebounds

Assists

Steals

Blocks

Turnovers

2-point field goal percentage

3-point field goal percentage

Free throw percentage

Team Game highs

See also
 2009 FIBA Africa Championship for Women

External links
Official Website

References

2008 FIBA Africa Under-18 Championship for Women
2008 FIBA Africa Under-18 Championship for Women
2008 FIBA Africa Under-18 Championship for Women
2008 in youth sport
FIBA